Gaurean Na Mohra is a town in the Islamabad Capital Territory of Pakistan. It is located at 33° 28' 10N 73° 24' 50E with an altitude of 600 metres (1971 feet).

References 

Union councils of Islamabad Capital Territory